Rapidcreekite is a rare mineral with formula Ca2(SO4)(CO3)·4H2O. The mineral is white to colorless and occurs as groupings of acicular (needle-shaped) crystals. It was discovered in 1983 in northern Yukon, Canada, and described in 1986. Rapidcreekite is structurally and compositionally similar to gypsum.

Description

Rapidcreekite is transparent and white to colorless.

Structure
In the structure of rapidcreekite, there are two distinct calcium sites coordinated by six oxygen anions and two H2O groups arranged as a square antiprism. The sulfur site is tetrahedrally coordinated by oxygen anions and the carbon site is coordinated by a triangle of oxygen anions. The structural unit of rapidcreekite is a sheet that consists of edge-sharing CaΦ8 polyhedra (Φ, unspecified species: O or OH) cross-linked by carbonate and sulfate groups. Sheets are held together by weakening hydrogen bonds, accounting for the perfect cleavage along {100}.

The structure and composition of rapidcreekite is similar to that of gypsum. If half of the sulfate groups in gypsum were replaced by carbonate, the formula of rapidcreekite is obtained. If gypsum were transformed by twinning along alternate rows of sulfate groups and the resultant triangles of oxygen along the boundary occupied by carbon, the structure of rapidcreekite would result.

History
The mineral was named rapidcreekite for the general area in which it was found. The mineral and name were approved by the IMA Commission on New Minerals and Mineral Names (IMA1984-035). Rapidcreekite was described in 1986 in the journal Canadian Mineralogist.

The holotype specimen, which consists of a few grams of rapidcreekite on a matrix, is held in the National Mineral Collection of the Geological Survey of Canada in Ottawa. Other specimens are held there and in the National Museum of Natural Sciences in Ottawa.

Occurrence
Rapidcreekite occurs in association with aragonite, gypsum, and kulanite. It has been found in Canada, Germany, Norway, and Romania. The rare mineral occurs as a secondary phase that formed along the surfaces of joints and bedding planes in a quartz-rich sideritic formation. In the Rapid Creek area, the formation occurred in Albian ironstones and shales.

References

Bibliography

External links

Orthorhombic minerals
Minerals in space group 60
Calcium minerals
Sulfate minerals
Carbonate minerals
Hydrates